The Hi-Line is a railroad in Montana running between Havre and Whitefish. It serves as a portion of the BNSF Railway Northern Transcon. Originally the mainline of the Great Northern Railway, the Hi-Line name has its origins in the railroad line being the northernmost transcontinental railway line in the United States. While the modern BNSF Railroad has only named this portion  the Hi-line, the term is colloquially used for other portions of the Northern Transcon. Hi-Line also more generally refers to the area of northern Montana near the Canada–United States border and U.S. Highway 2.

The route is served by one passenger train daily in each direction operating between Chicago and either Portland, Oregon or Seattle: Amtrak Empire Builder.

See also
Hi-Line Railroad Bridge, bridge along a different subdivision of the Northern Transcon.

References

External links
 Photographs and Information of the Montana Hi-Line Region

Regions of Montana
Rail transportation in the United States
Montana railroads
BNSF Railway lines